Back to the Roots is an album by pianist Ramsey Lewis which was recorded in 1971 and released on the Cadet label.

Reception

Allmusic awarded the album 2 stars.

Track listing
 "Candida" (Irwin Levine, Toni Wine) - 2:59   
 "We've Only Just Begun" (Paul Williams, Roger Nichols) - 3:58
 "Back to the Roots" (Cleveland Eaton, Morris Jennings, Ramsey Lewis) - 3:02   
 "Love Now On" (Eaton) - 5:07   
 "The Fool on the Hill" (John Lennon, Paul McCartney) - 6:05   
 "Since I Fell for You" (Buddy Johnson) - 3:03   
 "Up in Yonder" (Eaton) - 4:37   
 "Crescent Noon" (John Bettis, Richard Carpenter) - 4:33   
 "He Ain't Heavy, He's My Brother" (Bob Russell, Bobby Scott) - 7:02

Personnel 
Ramsey Lewis - piano, electric piano
Cleveland Eaton - electric bass
Morris Jennings  - drums
Henry L. Gibson - congas, percussion
Bobby Rush - harmonica (track 7) 
Charles Stepney - organ (track 7)

References 

1971 albums
Ramsey Lewis albums
Cadet Records albums
Albums produced by Esmond Edwards